Lieutenant General Sir Philip Neame,  (12 December 1888 – 28 April 1978) was a senior British Army officer and a recipient of the Victoria Cross, the highest award for gallantry in the face of the enemy that can be awarded to British and Commonwealth forces, and the winner of an Olympic Games gold medal; he is the only person to achieve both distinctions.

Early life and military career
Philip Neame was born on 12 December 1888 in Faversham in the County of Kent, the son of Kathleen Neame (née Stunt) and Frederick Neame (b. 1847). He received his education at Cheltenham College, and the British Army's Royal Military Academy at Woolwich, Kent.

Upon graduating from the Royal Military Academy, Neame received a commission as a second lieutenant into the Royal Engineers in July 1908. He was promoted to lieutenant in August 1910, whilst serving with the 15th Field Company.

First World War
The declaration of war in August 1914 (see British entry into World War I) found Neame with the 15th Field Company in the Gibraltar Garrison. The company joined the British Expeditionary Force (BEF) on the Western Front in October 1914.

During the First Battle of Ypres in October 1914, Neame experienced first hand in the trenches the inferiority of the British issue hand-grenades compared to their German equivalent, and set about creating an alternative, the sappers improvising rudimentary but effective hand grenades made from empty jam tins filled with scrap metal, with the charge being created using gun-cotton, and a cord-fuse projecting from the end of the tin, requiring ignition by flame.

Victoria Cross
Neame was 26 years old when the following deed took place, for which he received the Victoria Cross:

During a minor night trench action on the Western Front in the Neuve Chapelle district five days before Christmas 1914, Neame was leading a party of sappers in action when he was requested by the commanding officer of a battalion of the West Yorkshire Regiment to go forward and to strengthen the defences in a recently captured German trench. When he got there he met another commissioned officer who informed him that the Germans were counter-attacking with bombs, that his own bombers had all been wounded and that the bombs that were left would not go off. At this Neame went further up the trench to the contact point to talk to one of the surviving bombers there, and discovered that the problem was that he wasn't able use the bombs because there were no fuzee matches left. Neame, knowing how to technically ignite the grenades without a fuzee match by holding a regular match-head on the grenade's fuse and striking a match box across it, commenced lighting and throwing grenades in this fashion into the German trenches at the two different directions where a German dawn counter-attack was materializing, holding it back whilst under continual return fire for forty-five minutes whilst the West Yorks Regiment evacuated its wounded behind him back towards the original British frontline trench.

Neame was promoted to the rank of captain in 1915, and was mentioned in despatches in February 1915, and again in January 1916. He was awarded the Distinguished Service Order (DSO) in January 1916.

After a short period as a staff officer (GSO3) from October 1915, he was appointed brigade major of the 168th Brigade, 56th (London) Division, in February 1916, staffing this post through the Somme offensive in 1916, including the actions at Gommecourt on 1 July, and the Battle of Ginchy in September, until relinquishing it for another staff (GSO2) assignment in November 1916.

He was promoted to brevet major in the 1917 New Year honours list. He received further mentions in despatches in January and December 1917. In June 1918 he moved up to a senior staff post (GSO1), and ended the war in November 1918 with the temporary rank of lieutenant colonel.

Inter-war military career and Olympian
Neame was honoured for his war service in France with the Legion d'honneur (Croix de Chevalier) in January 1919, and the Croix de guerre in July. He was also awarded the Belgian Croix de guerre. In June 1919 he was noted in the London Gazette as being amongst several names intended for the rank of brevet lieutenant-colonel, with the substantive rank of major. but the actual gazetting to brevet lieutenant-colonel did not appear until June 1922, and his substantive rank was finally promoted from captain to major in January 1925.

He was a member of Great Britain's 1924 Olympic Running Deer team at Paris and is the only Victoria Cross recipient who has won an Olympic gold medal. The Running Deer competition was one of the shooting events at the games. It involved teams of four (firing single shots), where a moving target simulated the animal.

After serving as an instructor at the Staff College, Camberley from March 1919 to April 1923, he was appointed brigade major of an Infantry Brigade at Aldershot in January 1924 and then saw service in India with the Bengal Sappers and Miners from 1925 before attending the Imperial Defence College in 1930. In June 1932 Neame was promoted full colonel (skipping the substantive lieutenant-colonel rank) and became a General Staff Officer 1 in the Waziristan District in India. In 1933 he was badly mauled by a tigress whilst hunting in India. He was admitted to a hospital, Lady Minto Nursing Association, in Bareilly where he was nursed to health by Harriet Alberta Drew. He married the nurse, taking leave from India towards the end of 1933 whereupon he was on half pay without appointment until May 1934.

In July 1934 he was given temporary brigadier rank to take up an appointment as Brigadier General Staff with Eastern Command in India. In 1938 he was promoted to major-general and returned to England as Commandant of the Royal Military Academy, Woolwich, in 1938. He was appointed a Companion of the Order of the Bath in January 1939.

Second World War
While Commandant at the Military College, Neame had been given to understand that should war be declared, he would be appointed as Chief of General Staff to the British Expeditionary Force's putative C-in-C, John Dill. In the event, Lord Gort was appointed C-in-C, with Henry Pownall as CGS and Neame as his deputy responsible for operations and staff duties. Neame organised defences and planned for the campaign, but in February 1940 he was posted to Egypt to command the 4th Indian Infantry Division.

Middle East theatre
In August 1940 he was made General Officer Commanding British Forces in Palestine and Trans-Jordan in the acting rank of lieutenant-general where his responsibilities were mainly in the area of internal security (the local police forces being placed under his direction).

Defeat in North Africa
In February 1941 Neame was appointed General Officer Commanding & Military Governor of Cyrenaica, which had been captured from the Italians by the British Empire's rapid advance in the opening moves of the North African campaign during Operation Compass. Whilst being responsible for a large area of ground, Neame's command had been stripped of many of its battle-hardened units, which had been withdrawn towards Cairo either for re-fitting, or to take part in the Battle of Greece, and he was left with little air support from the constrained Royal Air Force (RAF) units available in North Africa at this time.

The two primary formations under his command to guard Cyrenaica were the newly fielded 2nd Armoured Division, and 9th Australian Division. The 2nd Armoured Division had only recently arrived from the British Isles, was under-strength, lacking in training and equipment adapted for desert warfare conditions, and proved to be no match for what it was about to meet in the field in the form of Nazi Germany's First Axis Offensive in North Africa, which was launched at the end of March 1941 by its newly arrived Afrika Korps, led by General Erwin Rommel. Australia's 9th Division, while well led by Leslie Morshead, was not yet fully trained, and was suffering from a shortage of transport vehicles.

First Axis Offensive in North Africa

Neame's Headquarters lacked accurate intelligence information from its senior command echelon, and had no warning about the nature or scale of the massed attack that it was about to be hit with, in a theatre scenario which was thought to be dormant at that time through Italian massed defeat and tactical acquiescence, and he was further hampered by an over-extended line of supply stretching back over many hundreds of miles to Alexandria and Cairo. With hesitant handling of his unprepared troop dispositions in response to a rapidly changing and unexpectedly threatening situation, as the Afrika Korps and Italian Army poured toward him at a terrific speed of advance and began on 24 March 1941 to attack his units' outposts and appear suddenly amidst, and even far behind them in the lines of supply routes, and his command being limited in effective control by a Headquarters not sited in a battle station and remote from the action, Neame was over the next few days of fighting overwhelmed by Rommel.  Faced with the apparent danger of the 2nd Armoured Division's disintegration which he perceived from its chaotic radio-traffic as it struggled to cope with the rolling blows it was receiving, he ordered the forces under him to fall back eastward in an uncoordinated fashion to avoid being cut off and completely destroyed by the sudden advance of the enemy.

On 6 April 1941, while driving in a small convoy of vehicles to a newly established Headquarters, Neame and his travelling companions, Lieutenant-General Richard O'Connor (who had been rapidly dispatched to join Neame's Headquarters by General Archibald Wavell who was alarmed at the apparent collapse of Neame's forces) and Brigadier John Combe, were over-run and captured by a German advanced force led by Gerhard von Schwerin. Disaster was averted for the majority of the forces under Neame's command through a rapid retreat by the 9th Australian Division into the coastal town of Tobruk, where it was joined by 3 Indian Motor Brigade, and surviving remnants of 2nd Armoured Division (most of which had been over-run and captured in the rout), in hastily organising a defensive perimeter, which would go on to withstand the Axis Forces' subsequent extended siege.

Prisoner of war in Italy
Along with the almost 3000 men of the 2nd Armoured Division who had been captured in Rommel's advance, Neame with generals O'Connor and Combe were transported across the Mediterranean Sea for incarceration in Italy, first being held as prize prisoners at the Villa Orsini near Sulmona, then at Castello di Vincigliata PG12 near Florence. Whilst at PG12 they took part in a number of escape attempts along with General Adrian Carton de Wiart (a fellow VC recipient), and Edward Todhunter.

After the successful escape of six men through a tunnel that Neame had designed in April 1943, including two New Zealander brigadiers James Hargest and Reginald Miles who disappeared in the direction of Switzerland, the Italian Army in reprisal sent Neame's batman Gunner Pickford (Royal Horse Artillery) to another camp.

Following the Italian Armistice in September 1943, Neame was released from incarceration by the Italian Army, but faced a hazardous journey of several hundred miles through a semi-chaotic countryside, at that time still occupied by German forces, in areas at conflict with the Italians, to reach the safety of the joint British and American lines. Having hidden a manuscript which he had been writing in captivity of his memoires (to be recovered after the war), Neame's party, including Air Marshal Owen Boyd and General Richard O'Connor, made their way southwards with the help of friendly Italians along the route. Hiring a boat at Cattolica they sailed to the port of Termoli which by the time of their arrival on 20 December 1943 had fallen into the possession of the advancing Allied armies.

Repatriation to England
Arriving back in England on 25 December 1943, having travelled via Tunis (after interviews with Generals Dwight Eisenhower and Harold Alexander, and also Winston Churchill), Neame found there was no job waiting for him in the Army, with his star in the descendent after the debacle of his capture in 1941, but he remained on the Active List until the end of the war in his substantive rank of major-general.

Postwar military career and retirement

In August 1945 he was appointed Lieutenant Governor of Guernsey in the local rank of lieutenant-general where he served until 1953. He also held the honorary posts of Colonel Commandant of the Corps of Royal Engineers from February 1945 to 1955 and Colonel 131 (Airborne) Engineer Regiment from January 1948.

He was knighted as a Knight Commander of the Order of the British Empire in June 1946, and made a knight of the charitable Order of St John in the same year. In January 1955 Neame was appointed a Deputy Lieutenant of the County of Kent.

Personal life
Neame married Harriet Drew (1906–1994) in 1934, the marriage producing four children: Gerald (b.1935), Veronica (b.1937), Nigel (b.1946), Philip (b.1946). His youngest child, also named Philip, served as commander of D Company, 2 Para, in 1982 during the Falklands War.

Neame died at Selling in Kent, on 28 April 1978 in his 90th year. His body was buried in the graveyard of St Mary the Virgin Church, in Selling.

His medals and awards are held by the Imperial War Museum in London.

References

Notes

Footnotes

Bibliography

External links

Royal Engineers Museum Sappers VCs
Location of grave (Kent)
Philip NEAME of Cheltenham College
Imperial War Museum Interview

British Army Officers 1939–1945
Generals of World War II

|-

|-

|-

|-

1888 births
1978 deaths
Burials in Kent
Commandants of the Royal Military Academy, Woolwich
People from Faversham
People educated at Cheltenham College
British male sport shooters
Running target shooters
Olympic shooters of Great Britain
Shooters at the 1924 Summer Olympics
English Olympic medallists
Olympic gold medallists for Great Britain
Royal Engineers officers
British Army personnel of World War I
British World War I recipients of the Victoria Cross
British Army generals of World War II
British World War II prisoners of war
World War II prisoners of war held by Italy
British escapees
Escapees from Italian detention
Companions of the Order of the Bath
Knights Commander of the Order of the British Empire
Knights of Grace of the Order of St John
Companions of the Distinguished Service Order
Chevaliers of the Légion d'honneur
Olympic medalists in shooting
British Army recipients of the Victoria Cross
Medalists at the 1924 Summer Olympics
Sportspeople from Gloucestershire
Graduates of the Royal College of Defence Studies
Academics of the Staff College, Camberley
Military personnel from Kent
British Army lieutenant generals